Prasanna Kumar Basavalingappa better known as B. Prasanna Kumar is an Indian politician. He was a Member of Legislative Assembly for Yelahanka constituency from 1999 to 2008 and Pulakeshinagar constituency from 2008 to 2013.

Political career
Kumar entered political life after his father B. Basavalingappa's (former minister) death and contested in his father's constituency in Yelahanka in 1993.

Personal life
Kumar has two children. His elder daughter is Dr Lavanya and his younger son Mr Varun is an upcoming politician.

References

Karnataka MLAs 1999–2004
Karnataka MLAs 2004–2007
Karnataka MLAs 2008–2013
Living people
Indian National Congress politicians from Karnataka
1953 births